Acanthoderes rubripes is a species of beetle in the family Cerambycidae. It was described by Henry Walter Bates in 1872. This species has been observed in the Chontales Department in Nicaragua as well as at Volcan de Chiriqui and Bugaba in Panama.

References

Acanthoderes
Beetles described in 1872
Taxa named by Henry Walter Bates